Andrea Ardito (born 8 January 1977) is an Italian football coach and a former player who played as a midfielder.

Club career
Born in Viareggio, Tuscany, Ardito started his professional career at Tuscan club Pontedera. In 1999, he was signed by Como. The club won promotion to Serie A in 2002. However, he was signed by Bologna on 11 July 2002 in temporary deal. On 12 September 2002 he was signed by Siena in temporary deal. On 11 July 2003 the Tuscan side signed Ardito outright for €200,000.

Ardito made his Serie A debut for Siena on 31 August 2003, against Perugia. On 20 August 2005 Ardito was signed by Torino F.C. He won promotion to Serie A again with the Turin-based club in 2006.

In 2007, he was signed by Serie B club Lecce. In 2009, he returned to Como, for their Lega Pro Prima Divisione campaign.

Coaching career
On 3 July 2021, he was hired as head coach of Serie D club Castellanzese. He was fired on 17 October 2021 after the club started the season with 5 losses in the first 6 games.

References

External links
 Profile at La Gazetta dello Sport (2006–07 season)  
 AIC profile (data by football.it) 
 

1977 births
People from Viareggio
Footballers from Tuscany
Living people
Italian footballers
Association football midfielders
U.S. Città di Pontedera players
Como 1907 players
Bologna F.C. 1909 players
A.C.N. Siena 1904 players
Torino F.C. players
U.S. Lecce players
Serie A players
Serie B players
Serie C players
Italian football managers
U.S.D. 1913 Seregno Calcio managers
Serie D managers
Sportspeople from the Province of Lucca